Monero is a cryptocurrency. It may also refer to:

Places
 Monero, New Mexico, a populated place located in Rio Arriba County, US
 Moneró, Rio de Janeiro, a neighborhood in Brazil

People
 Mark Monero (born 1968), British actor
 José Luis Moneró (1921–2011), Puerto Rican musician and band leader
 María Luisa Moneró, actress in the film The Lady from Trévelez